Litany, in Christian worship and some forms of Judaic worship, is a form of prayer used in services and processions, and consisting of a number of petitions. The word comes through Latin litania from Ancient Greek λιτανεία (litaneía), which in turn comes from λιτή (litḗ), meaning "supplication".

Christianity

Western Christianity
This form of prayer finds its model in Psalm 136: "Praise the Lord, for he is good: for his mercy endures for ever. Praise ye the God of gods . . . the Lord of lords . . . Who alone doth great wonders . . . Who made the heavens", etc., with the concluding words in each verse, "for his mercy endures for ever."

The Litany originated in Antioch in the fourth century and from there was taken to Constantinople and through it to the rest of the East...From Constantinople the Litany was taken to Rome and the West. Josef Andreas Jungmann explains how the Kyrie in the Roman Mass is best seen as a vestige of a litany at the beginning of the Mass, like that of some Eastern churches.

Public Christian devotions became common by the fifth century and processions were frequently held. These processions were called "litanies", and in them pictures and other religious emblems were carried. In Rome, pope and people would go in procession each day, especially in Lent, to a different church, to celebrate the Sacred Mysteries. Thus originated the Roman "Stations", and what was called the "Litania Maior",  "Major Rogation", was held on 25 April. The word rogation comes from the Latin verb rogare, meaning "to ask", which reflects the beseeching of God for the appeasement of his anger and for protection from calamities. 

In 590, when an epidemic caused by an overflow of the Tiber was ravaging Rome, Gregory the Great commanded a litany; on the preceding day he exhorted the people to fervent prayer, and arranged the order to be observed in the procession, during which the Litany of the Saints was prayed. 

The "Litania Minor", also called Minor Rogations or "Gallicana", the Rogation Days before Ascension, was introduced (477) by St. Mamertus, Bishop of Vienne, on account of the earthquakes and other calamities then prevalent. It was prescribed for the whole of Frankish Gaul, in 511, by the First Council of Orléans. For Rome it was ordered by Leo III, in 799. In the Ambrosian Rite this litany was celebrated on Monday, Tuesday, and Wednesday after Ascension. In Spain we find a similar litany from Thursday to Saturday after Pentecost. In England the Litany of Rogation Days was known in the earliest periods. In Germany it was ordered by a Synod of Mainz in 813.  

Because the Mass Litany became popular through its use in processions, numberless varieties were soon made, especially in the Middle Ages. Litanies appeared in honour of God the Father, of God the Son, of God the Holy Ghost, of the Precious Blood, of the Blessed Virgin, of the Immaculate Conception, of each of the saints honoured in different countries, for the souls in Purgatory, etc. In 1601 Baronius wrote that about eighty forms were in circulation. To prevent abuse, Pope Clement VIII, by decree of 6 September 1601, forbade the publication of any litany, except that of the saints as found in the liturgical books and that of Loreto.

Anglican litanies

The Anglican Communion also has a Litany in the 1662 Book of Common Prayer. This is substantially the same as Thomas Cranmer's original English vernacular service from 1544, Exhortation and Litany. Cranmer drew on a  variety of sources, chiefly two medieval litanies from the Sarum rite, but also the German Litany of Martin Luther. He originally retained the invocation of the Saints and the Blessed Virgin Mary in very shortened form, but these were omitted in 1549, and he made a notable change in the style of the service by expanding and grouping together said by the priest and provided but a single response to the whole group. An anti-papal clause was omitted in 1559. The processional aspect was soon eliminated and the service said or sung kneeling in the church.  The term "the Lesser Litany" is sometimes used to refer to the versicles and responses, with the Lord's Prayer, that follow the Apostles' Creed at Morning Prayer (or Matins) and Evening Prayer (or Evensong).  

Many other litanies are used in private prayer. A Marian litany is one dedicated to the Blessed Virgin Mary; only one is authorised for public recitation (mentioned above).  The Litany of humility is another well-known prayer.

Catholic litanies
In the Catholic Church, six litanies are approved for public recitation:
 The Litany of the Holy Name of Jesus
 The Litany of the Sacred Heart of Jesus
 The Litany of the Most Precious Blood of Jesus
 The Litany of the Blessed Virgin Mary (also known as the Litany of Loreto)
 The Litany of Saint Joseph
 The Litany of the Saints

While others are approved merely for private devotion such as The Litany of the Blessed Sacrament and The Litany of the Passion.

Lutheran litanies
Much of the historic Litany was retained by the Lutheran Church. Luther hailed it as one of the greatest Christian prayers ever. When faced with the Turkish armies at the gates of Vienna in 1528/29, Luther exhorted pastors to call their Christian people to repentance and prayer. He recommended the use of the Litany during the Sunday mass or Vespers. In 1529, he, after modifying the traditional Litany of the Saints (mostly by removing the invocation of saints and prayers for the pope), began using the Litany at Wittenberg in Latin and German. Thomas Cranmer used Luther's revised Litany as one of his main sources in the preparation of the Litany in the Book of Common Prayer. Today, a form of the Litany continues to be used in the various Lutheran Churches around the world.

Methodist litanies
The Methodist The Book of Worship for Church and Home (1965) contains the following litanies:
The Litany of Recollection of Jesus
The Litany on the Will of God
The Litany of the Divine Will
The Litany of Self-Examination
The Litany of Confession
The Litany of Supplication
The Litany of Remembrance 
The Litany of Commemoration 
The Litany of Intercession
The Litany for Peace

Eastern Christianity

In the Eastern Orthodox and Byzantine Catholic churches, a litany is referred to as an ektenia. There are numerous ektenias during the Byzantine divine services: the Divine Liturgy, Vespers, Matins, the  Sacred Mysteries (Sacraments), and numerous other services.

The petitions of the ektenias are usually chanted by a deacon (but if there is no deacon the priest will say the petitions), to each of which the choir (chanters) or congregation will respond. The response is usually Kyrie eleison ("Lord, have mercy"), but other responses are used at different ektenias. After the final petition, the priest makes the ekphonesis (exclamation) which summarizes the ektenia, and always involves an invocation of the Holy Trinity.

Judaism
Although used to a much lesser extent in Jewish worship, litanies do appear in Jewish liturgy. The most notable examples are the Hoshanot recited in the additional (musaf) service during all seven days of the Sukkot festival.  These are mostly alphabetical acrostics to which the refrain at the end of each line is "Hoshanah"!, a contraction of the biblical Hoshi'a na (Psalm 118:25), "Save us, please!" These are recited in a procession around the sanctuary, with congregants holding the lulav and etrog (the biblical "Four Species" of Leviticus 23:40). They are essentially prayers for rain. 

Litanies are also recited during the Ten Days of Repentance. The most famous of these "supplicatory" prayers is Avinu Malkeinu ("Our Father, Our King"), which is recited during Rosh Hashanah and Yom Kippur liturgies. Certain Selichot prayers also take the form of a litany during the month of Elul, as do some prayers recited on fast days.

Mandaeism

Litanies are often recited in Mandaeism. The most commonly recited Mandaean litanies are the Asiet Malkia and Tabahatan.

Islam

Musical settings

 Marc-Antoine Charpentier, Litany of Loreto, 9 settings, H.82 (1680), H.83 (1683-85), H.84 (1690), H.85 (1688-90), H.86 (1690), H.87 (1690), H.88 (1690), H.89 (1690), H.90 (1690).
 Henry Dumont, Litany of Loreto (1652)
František Ignac Tuma, Lytaniae Lauretanae (18. century)
 Karol Szymanowski, Litany to the Virgin Mary Op.59 (1933)
 Francis Poulenc, Litanies de la Vierge noir. He wrote in 1936 Litanies à la Vierge Noire (Litanies to the Black Virgin) after a pilgrimage to the shrine of Rocamadour, setting a French local pilgrimage litany.
 American rapper, singer, songwriter, and record producer Kanye West composed a litany in his song Water released on October 25, 2019.

See also
Exhortation and Litany (1544)
Litany against fear
Litany of humility
Litany of the Blessed Virgin Mary
Lorica

Notes
 

Litanies
Lutheran liturgy and worship
Christian processions